This is the discography of Singaporean singer-songwriter JJ Lin. Lin has released thirteen studio albums, two compilation albums, three live albums, one video album and one documentary.

Albums

Studio albums

Compilation albums

Live albums

Video albums

Documentaries

English EP

Singles

Others

Movies
Love You You 夏日乐悠悠 (2011) - Music director for film score and soundtrack

Video Games
 Dota 2 - JJ Lin Timekeeper Music Pack Bundle (2016)

References

Discographies of Singaporean artists
Mandopop discographies